Cuyamungue is a census-designated place (CDP) in Santa Fe County, New Mexico, United States. It is part of the Santa Fe, New Mexico Metropolitan Statistical Area. The population was 479 at the 2010 census.

Geography
Cuyamungue is located at  (35.869569, -106.009854).

Demographics

As of the census of 2000, there were 421 people, 154 households, and 121 families residing in the CDP. The population density was 1,045.8 people per square mile (406.4/km2). There were 165 housing units at an average density of 409.9 per square mile (159.3/km2). The racial makeup of the CDP was 61.05% White, 1.90% Native American, 31.59% from other races, and 5.46% from two or more races. Hispanic or Latino of any race were 83.37% of the population.

There were 154 households, out of which 39.6% had children under the age of 18 living with them, 59.7% were married couples living together, 14.3% had a female householder with no husband present, and 20.8% were non-families. 14.9% of all households were made up of individuals, and 3.9% had someone living alone who was 65 years of age or older. The average household size was 2.73 and the average family size was 3.00.

In the CDP, the population was spread out, with 26.4% under the age of 18, 8.6% from 18 to 24, 32.1% from 25 to 44, 21.1% from 45 to 64, and 11.9% who were 65 years of age or older. The median age was 36 years. For every 100 females, there were 89.6 males. For every 100 females age 18 and over, there were 90.2 males.

The median income for a household in the CDP was $43,958, and the median income for a family was $47,969. Males had a median income of $41,000 versus $29,196 for females. The per capita income for the CDP was $18,887. About 3.6% of families and 7.8% of the population were below the poverty line, including 11.4% of those under age 18 and 7.0% of those age 65 or over.

Education
It is zoned to Pojoaque Valley Schools. Pojoaque Valley High School is the zoned comprehensive high school.

Etymology
From Tewa language, kooya mooghay-ong-wee, "place where the Spanish live near." Don Diego de Vargas was here in September 1692. An early spelling of the name, Cullamunque, was recorded by the Public Record Office of New Spain dated August 23, 1719.

See also

 List of census-designated places in New Mexico

References

External links

Census-designated places in Santa Fe County, New Mexico
Census-designated places in New Mexico